Karl William may refer to:

Karl William (born 1995), Danish singer, songwriter
Karl William Hofmann (born 1961), President/CEO of the global humanitarian and health organization, Population Services International
Karl William Kapp (1910–1976), German-American economist
Karl William Pamp Jenkins (born 1944), Welsh musician

See also
Karl Wilhelm Reinmuth (1892–1979), also known as Karl William Reinmuth, German astronomer
Karl Williams (born 1971), US American football player